Low Class Conspiracy is the debut album by David Murray which was released on the Adelphi label in 1976.

Reception
The Allmusic review by Scott Yanow awarded the album 3 stars, stating, "At 21, Murray already had remarkable technique and these explorations with bassist Fred Hopkins and drummer Phillip Wilson are quite adventurous... None of the compositions themselves are that memorable and some listeners may find Murray's screams and screeches (which he would modify a bit in later years) to be a bit too emotional, but this was a strong first effort."

Track listing
All compositions by David Murray except as indicated
 "Extremininity" - 7:30
 "Dewey's Circle" - 12:22
 "Low Class Conspiracy" - 9:30
 "B./T." - 5:13
 "Dedication to Jimmy Garrison" (Fred Hopkins) - 4:09
Recorded on May 14, 1976 at Studio Rivbea, NYC (track 1) and June 29, 1976 at Blue Rock Studio, NYC (tracks 2-5)

Personnel
David Murray - tenor saxophone
Fred Hopkins - bass (tracks 2-5)
Phillip Wilson - drums (tracks 2-5)

References

1976 debut albums
David Murray (saxophonist) albums
Albums produced by Michael Cuscuna
Adelphi Records albums